Naksie Krivanjeva (born 18 August 1994) is a Macedonian footballer who plays as a midfielder. She has been a member of the Macedonia women's national team.

References

1994 births
Living people
Women's association football midfielders
Macedonian women's footballers
North Macedonia women's international footballers